Ilomastat (INN), (codenamed GM6001, proprietary name Galardin®) is a broad-spectrum matrix metalloproteinase inhibitor.

This chemotherapy agent is considered to have application in skincare products for its antiaging properties.

Ilomastat is a member of the hydroxamic acid class of reversible metallopeptidase inhibitors. The anionic state of the hydroxamic acid group forms a bidentate complex with the active site zinc.

Examples of enzymes that ilomastat inhibit include rabbit MMP9, thermolysin, peptide deformylase, and anthrax lethal factor endopeptidase (LF) produced by the bacterium Bacillus anthracis.

References

Hydroxamic acids
Matrix metalloproteinase inhibitors